Jungle Tales is an Indian computer-animated television series produced by Moving Pictures Company India. It is an adaptation of stories from the Panchatantra and it was the first indigenous 3D animation programming on the small screen. It premiered on 6 November 2004 on Cartoon Network.

See also
The Jungle Book

References

2004 Indian television series debuts
Indian computer-animation
Indian children's animated television series
Cartoon Network (Indian TV channel) original programming
Animated television series about mammals
Animated television series about birds
Animated television series about insects
Animated television series about fish
Animated television series about reptiles and amphibians